Roy Ernest Palmer (10 February 1932 – 26 February 2015) was a singer, teacher, folklorist, author and historian who wrote more than 30 books on folklore and folk song. In 2003 he was awarded the Gold Badge, the English Folk Dance and Song Society's highest honour.

He had much experience of performing to an audience, setting him apart from better known folk song scholars and anthologists who collected material but were less concerned with singing it.

Life 
Born in 1932, Roy Palmer was educated at the Grammar School, Coalville, and at Manchester University. While at college he met Harry Boardman, a folk singer whose left-wing views he shared throughout his life. He taught for many years in grammar and comprehensive schools around the Midlands and was headmaster of the Dame Elizabeth Cadbury School in Birmingham for eleven years.

In the 1960s he began recording and publishing traditional folk songs. A collection of his recordings are in the British Library and other materials are archived at the Library of Birmingham.

He met the BBC producer Charles Parker whilst organising informal folk song evenings for CND in Birmingham during the 1960s. The two men joined with other local enthusiasts to establish the Birmingham and Midland Folk Centre in order to sing folk songs, appraise each other's singing, collect and research songs and produce documentary dramas.

He took early retirement, making time to explore his deep passion in all aspects of folk culture - its lore, dialect, crafts, arts, plays and above all, its songs and music. From 1970 to 2007 he produced a steady stream of books, articles and reviews, exploring social history through the medium of folk song and street ballads.

In 2003 was awarded a gold badge, the highest honour bestowed by the English Folk Dance and Song Society, and in 2004 he received an honorary MA from the Open University.

He was a long-standing member of The Folklore Society, chairman of the 'Friends of the Dymock Poets' for seven years and on the editorial board of Folk Music Journal for 20 years.

Bibliography 

 Room for Company, Cambridge University Press, 1971: 
 Love is Pleasing, Cambridge University Press, 1974: 
 Songs of the Midlands, EP Publishing, 1972: 
 Rigs of the Fair (Roy Palmer and Jon Raven), Cambridge University Press, 1976; 
 Folk Music in School (Robert Leach and Roy Palmer), Cambridge University Press, 1978; 
 Feasts and Seasons - Spring (Anthony Adams, Robert Leach, Roy Palmer), Blackie, 1978; 
 Feasts and Seasons - Summer (Anthony Adams, Robert Leach, Roy Palmer), Blackie, 1978; 
 Feasts and Seasons - Autumn (Anthony Adams, Robert Leach, Roy Palmer), Blackie, 1977; 
 Feasts and Seasons - Winter (Anthony Adams, Robert Leach, Roy Palmer), Blackie, 1977: 
 Rose Shamrock Thistle Leek (Bryan Lester and Roy Palmer), Ricordi, 1989
 The Folklore of Shropshire, Logaston Press, 2004; 
 Britain's Living Folklore, David & Charles, 1991; 
 Folklore of Gloucestershire, Westcountry Books, 1994; 
 Folklore of Leicestershire and Rutland, Wymondham: Sycamore Press, 1985  
--do.-- Stroud: Tempus Publishing, 2002: 
 Folklore of (old) Monmouthshire, Logaston Press, 1998: 
 Folklore of Hereford and Worcester, Logaston Press, 1992: 
 Folklore of the Black Country, Logaston Press, 2007; 
 Folklore of Radnorshire, Logaston Press, 2001: 
 Folklore of Shropshire, Logaston Press, 2004: 
 Folklore of Warwickshire, Stroud: Tempus, 2004 (First published Batsford 1976); 
 Folklore of Worcestershire, Logaston Press, 2005; 
 Herefordshire Folklore, Logaston Press, 2002: 
 The Sound Of History, Oxford University Press, 1988; 
 A Ballad History Of England, Batsford, 1979; 
 Strike The Bell: transport by road, canal, rail and sea in the nineteenth century through songs, ballads and contemporary accounts, Cambridge University Press, 1978; 
 The Valiant Sailor, Cambridge University Press, 1973: 
 The Oxford Book of Sea Songs, Oxford University Press, 1986: 
 Boxing the Compass Sea Songs and Shanties, Heron Publishing, 2001: 
 A Touch on the Times, Penguin, 1974; 
 Poverty Knock, Cambridge University Press, 1974; 
 The Painful Plough, Cambridge University Press, 1972; 
 The Rambling Soldier, Penguin Books, 1977:   
 Everyman's Book of British Ballads, London: JM Dent and Sons, 1980: 
 Everyman's Book of English Country Songs, London: JM Dent and Sons, 1979: 
 Folk Songs collected by Ralph Vaughan Williams, London: JM Dent and Sons, 1983; 
 Secret River (Roy and Pat Palmer), Green Branch Press, 1998; 
 Let us be Merry (Gwilym Davies and Roy Palmer), Green Branch, 1996: 
 A Taste of Ale, Green Branch, 2000: 
 What A Lovely War - British Soldiers Songs, London: Michael Joseph, 1990; 
 Ripest Apples, The Big Apple Association, 1996: 
 Working Songs, Herron Publishing, 2010:

References

1932 births
2015 deaths
English folklorists
English folk singers
English male non-fiction writers
20th-century English male writers
21st-century English male writers
People from Leicestershire